Witzenhausen is a small town in the Werra-Meißner-Kreis in northeastern Hesse, Germany.

It was granted town rights in 1225, and until 1974, it was a district seat.

The University of Kassel maintains a satellite campus in Witzenhausen at which is offered the ecological agricultural sciences programme, which is unique in the country. This also puts Witzenhausen among Germany's smallest university towns. Furthermore, a teaching institute (DEULA) for environment and technology, agriculture, horticulture and landscaping. The town is also nationally known for the invention of the Biotonne – a biological refuse container – in 1983, and as an important cherry-growing area; it is said to be Europe's biggest self-contained cherry-growing area. Cherries are traditional in Witzenhausen, which has led to the yearly Kesperkirmes, or “Cherry Fair” (Kesper is a regional name for the cherry; the standard German word is Kirsche), at which a Cherry Queen (Kirschenkönigin) is chosen.

Geography

Location
Witzenhausen lies on the northeast slope of the Kaufunger Wald, which is surrounded by the Meißner-Kaufunger Wald Nature Park. The town is found at the mouth of the Gelster, where it empties into the Werra some 30 km east of Kassel, 16 km east-southeast of Hann. Münden, 25 km south of Göttingen and 23 km northwest of Eschwege.

Neighbouring communities
Witzenhausen borders in the north on the town of Hann. Münden, the communities of Rosdorf and Friedland (all three in Lower Saxony's Göttingen district), in the east on the communities of Neu-Eichenberg (in the Werra-Meißner-Kreis), Bornhagen and Lindewerra (both in Thuringia’s Eichsfeld district), in the south on the towns of Bad Sooden-Allendorf and Großalmerode and the unincorporated area of Gutsbezirk Kaufunger Wald (all three in the Werra-Meißner-Kreis) and in the west on the community of Staufenberg in Lower Saxony’s Göttingen district.

Constituent communities
Witzenhausen’s 16 Stadtteile, besides the main town, also called Witzenhausen, are, on the Werra’s left bank:
Blickershausen (293 inhabitants), 
Dohrenbach (657 inhabitants), 
Ellingerode (344 inhabitants), 
Ermschwerd (1189 inhabitants), 
Hubenrode (191 inhabitants), 
Hundelshausen (1365 inhabitants), 
Kleinalmerode (925 inhabitants), 
Roßbach (825 inhabitants), 
Wendershausen (831 inhabitants)  
Ziegenhagen (716 inhabitants),

On the river’s right bank:
Albshausen (69 inhabitants), 
Berlepsch-Ellerode-Hübenthal (132 inhabitants), 
Gertenbach (947 inhabitants), 
Neuseesen (97 inhabitants), 
Unterrieden (914 inhabitants)  
Werleshausen (503 inhabitants).

History

In 1898, the Deutsche Kolonialschule für Landwirtschaft, Handel und Gewerbe (“German Colonial School for Agriculture, Trade and Industry”, also called the Tropenschule, or “Tropical School”) was founded to train people in agriculture for resettlement in Germany's colonies. The successor institution forms today a satellite campus of the University of Kassel, and includes a greenhouse complex dedicated to tropical crops (the Gewächshaus für tropische Nutzpflanzen).

Main sights

Buildings
 Historic town centre with various important timber-frame houses:
 Grau’sches Haus
 Rotes Haus
 Steinernes Haus
 Sommermann’sches Haus
 Meinhard-Wedekind’sches Haus
 Persch’sches Haus
 Liebfrauenkirche (church)
 Historic Town Hall
 Erlöserkirche (church)
 Diebesturm (“Thief’s Tower”), Eulenturm (“Owls’ Tower”) and parts of the old town wall
 Former Williamite monastery, part of the Colonial School and today part of the University of Kassel
 Gelsterhof Estate, the former Colonial School's farm
 Burg Ludwigstein (castle)

Museums
 Völkerkundliches Museum (ethnology)
 Greenhouse for domesticated tropical plants

Parks
 Town park with swan pond (former firefighting pond)

Politics

Town council

The municipal election held on 27 March 2011 yielded the following results:

At first, the current council was ruled by a CDU-Green-FWG coalition, but this was dissolved in September 2007.

Mayors 

1945-1948: Eduard Platner (CDU)
1987-2005: Günter Engel (SPD)
2005-2018: Angela Fischer (CDU)
2018- : Daniel Herz (independent)

Events
 Witzenhäuser Woche, partly in conjunction with German Queens’ Day (Deutscher Königinnentag), every 3 years (in 2007 more than 200 guest queens, princesses and kings).
 Kesperkirmes, the “cherry fair” in the Old Town with election of the Cherry Queen and German cherry pip spitting championship.
 Cherry Man (Triathlon)
 Erntedank- und Heimatfest (“Harvest and Homeland Festival “), 20–25 August 2008, this year with Jürgen Drews as the star guest on Sunday in the festival tent at Joseph Pott Platz
 In 2006 Witzenhausen was the starting point for the third stage of the Deutschland Tour
 Christmas market

Economy and infrastructure
Witzenhausen suffers – like the whole Werra-Meißner-Kreis and a great part of North Hesse – from extremely high unemployment and its attendant loss of younger people to migration.

In Witzenhausen-Unterrieden, the last producer of chewing tobacco in Germany is still in business. An important employer in Witzenhausen is, with 430 employees all together, the corporation Svenska Cellulosa Aktiebolaget (SCA). In Witzenhausen the SCA produces raw paper for corrugated cardboard for manufacturing packagings (SCA Packaging Containerboard) and hygiene products such as toilet paper (SCA Hygiene Products). Another important employer is the district and town hospital in Witzenhausen.

Witzenhausen is domicile of Gesellschaft zur Erhaltung alter und gefährdeter Haustierrassen (GEH, the society for the conservation of old and endangered livestock breeds).

Media

Print
 Witzenhäuser Allgemeine (Hessische/Niedersächsische Allgemeine)
 Markt Spiegel
 Witzenhüsser
 Extra Tipp

Wireless
 RundFunk Meißner

Transport

Over Bundesstraßen 27 (Göttingen–Eschwege), 80 (Hann. Münden–Heiligenstadt) and 451 (Helsa–Witzenhausen), the town is linked to the greater road network. In Hedemünden, some 10 km away, is an interchange on the Autobahn A 7 (Flensburg–Füssen). Near Friedland is an interchange on the A 38 towards Halle. Moreover, Witzenhausen is on the two tourist routes: the German Timber-Frame Road (Deutsche Fachwerkstraße) and the German Fairy Tale Route (Deutsche Märchenstraße).

Witzenhausen has a railway station, Witzenhausen Nord, on the Eichenberg–Kassel section of the Halle-Kassel Railway. It is located above the town on the north slope of the Werra valley and is served by trains to Kassel, Göttingen, Erfurt and Halle. The former Witzenhausen Süd station stood southeast of the inner town and has been closed, like the whole of the Gelster Valley Railway between Eichenberg and –Großalmerode.

The outlying centre of Gertenbach has a further stop on the Halle-Kassel railway

Education
 Grundschule Gertenbach (primary school)
 Gelstertalschule Hundelshausen (primary school)
 Grundschule Witzenhausen (primary school)
 Steintorschule (school for help with learning)
 Johannisbergschule Witzenhausen (comprehensive school)
 Berufliche Schulen des Werra-Meißner-Kreises (vocational schools)
 University of Kassel
 Medienzentrum Witzenhausen (media centre)
 Bildstelle des Werra-Meißner-Kreises (training centre)
 Deutsches Institut für tropische und subtropische Landwirtschaft GmbH (DITSL, “German Institute for Tropical and Subtropical Agriculture”)
 IBZW Internationales Bildungszentrum Witzenhausen GmbH (training centre)
 DEULA Lehranstalt für angewandte Technik GmbH
 Folk high school
 GNE Witzenhausen

Famous people

 Burkhardt von Berlepsch (1619-1691), lawyer and administrative officer
 Johann Jacob Schweppe, (1740-1821), German watchmaker and silversmith, inventor of the trademark Schweppes
 Carl Friedrich Wilhelm Ludwig, (1816-1895), German physiologist
 Hermann von Christen, (1841-1919), Member of the Reichstag
 Edward Schröder (1858-1942), a Germanist mediavist
 Theodor Neubauer (1890-1945), German sociologist, educator, parliamentarian and Resistance fighter against National Socialism
 Heinz Bonatz (born 1897), German naval officer
 Helga Seibert, (1939-1999), German constitutional judge
 Bodo Abel (born 1948), economist
 Stefan Markolf (born 1984), first deaf German professional footballer for, among others, 1. FSV Mainz 05, Wuppertaler SV Borussia
 Diether Haenicke, President of Western Michigan University
 Aidan "A-Danöwitz McMahonowitz" Murphy, Irishman and Krypto-Jew

Town partnerships
Witzenhausen is twinned with:
 Saint-Vallier, France, since 1975
 Vignola, Italy, since 1995
 Filton, United Kingdom, since 1978
 Kayunga, Uganda, since 2001

Since 1979, Filton, St. Vallier and Witzenhausen have had a three-way partnership.

Between Witzenhausen and Filton, and between Witzenhausen and St. Vallier, there are regular student exchanges with the local comprehensive school. The partnership between Witzenhausen and St. Vallier came about by accident. St. Vallier's mayor's last name at the time was Witzenhausen, and when, on a visit to Germany, he spotted this name on a road sign, he drove to the town. Out of his visit sprang the partnership, which has lasted to this day.

Furthermore, there have been school exchanges between Witzenhausen and these two places since 2002:
 100 Mile House, Canada (between the comprehensive school and the secondary school there)
 Turlock, USA (between the vocational Gymnasium and Turlock High School)

References

External links
 Kirschenland, tourist information about Witzenhausen 
 Town’s official webpage 

Werra-Meißner-Kreis